Lodewijk Benedictus Johannes "Louis" Stuyt (16 June 1914 – 30 October 2000) was a Dutch politician of the defunct Catholic People's Party (KVP) now merged into the Christian Democratic Appeal (CDA) and physician.

Decorations

References

External links

Official
  Dr. L.B.J. (Louis) Stuijt Parlement & Politiek

1914 births
2000 deaths
Catholic People's Party politicians
Dutch internists
Dutch medical researchers
Dutch Roman Catholics
Members of the Council of State (Netherlands)
Ministers of Health of the Netherlands
Officers of the Order of Orange-Nassau
Politicians from Amsterdam
University of Amsterdam alumni
20th-century Dutch physicians
20th-century Dutch politicians
Physicians from Amsterdam